Glossodia is a semi-rural suburb of Sydney, in the state of New South Wales, Australia. Glossodia is located 68 kilometres north-west of the Sydney central business district in the local government area of the City of Hawkesbury.

History
Glossodia was formerly known as "Currency Creek" and its name was changed in 1922. The name Glossodia originates from a small genus of mostly purple orchids from Australia, which grow in the area.

Population
According to the 2016 census, there were 2,828 residents in Glossodia. 86.9% of people were born in Australia and 91.7% of people spoke only English at home. The most common ancestries were Australian 33.5%, English 30.1%, Scottish 6.4%, Irish 6.3% and Maltese 5.9%. The most common responses for religion were Catholic 29.5%, Anglican 29.0 and No Religion 24.6%.

Landmarks
The suburb is home to Glossodia Public School. The area includes a day care centre, Community Centre, shops, and soccer fields, all within walking distance of the school. 
It is also the location of the Sydney Guide Dog Centre.

References 

Suburbs of Sydney
City of Hawkesbury